Eleutherodactylus probolaeus is a species of frog in the family Eleutherodactylidae endemic to the La Romana Province, Dominican Republic, at elevations of  asl. Its natural habitat is low elevation semi-mesic broadleaf forest. It is moderately common in suitable habitat but threatened by habitat loss, mainly caused by tourism and agriculture.

References

probolaeus
Endemic fauna of the Dominican Republic
Amphibians of the Dominican Republic
Taxa named by Albert Schwartz (zoologist)
Amphibians described in 1965
Taxonomy articles created by Polbot